Krishnan Love Story is a 2010 Indian Kannada language action drama film written and directed by Shashank, and starring Ajay Rao,  Radhika Pandit in leading roles and Umashri, Achyuth Kumar, Sharan, Pradeep, Harsha and Chandra in supporting roles.The music of this film is composed by Sridhar V. Sambhram. The movie was remade in Bengali in 2018 as Piya Re by Surinder Films starring Soham Chakraborty.

Cast
 Ajay Rao as Krishna 
 Radhika Pandit as Geetha 
 Umashree
 Achyuth Kumar
 Sharan
 Pradeep Bogadi as Narendra 
Pavan Benaka 
P. N. Sathya 
Rithesh 
Kempegowda 
Master Rakesh 
Master Manju 
 Harsha
Ashok rao 
 Kaddipudi Chandru as Chandru, Geetha's brother
Shashank 
 Padmaja Rao
Lakshmi Hegde 
 Ninasam Ashwath
Jadi Akash
 Yogesh; special appearance in Mosa Madalendu Neenu

Soundtrack

Sridhar V. Sambhram composed the film's background score and music for its soundtrack. The lyrics for the soundtrack was written by V. Sridhar, Yogaraj Bhat, Jayant Kaikini and Shashank. The album consists of eight tracks.

Reception

Critical response 

A critic from The Times of India scored the film at 4 out of 5 stars and wrote "While Ajai Rao is amazing, Harsha and Pradeep shine. Umashri is impressive. Sharan, Achyuth Kumar, Chandru have done justice to the role. The real hero of the movie is Sridhar V Sambhram who has given some melodious numbers. Shekhar Chandra's cinematography is equally brilliant". Shruti Indira Lakshminarayana of Rediff scored the film at 3 out of 5 stars and says "The film is partly based on a true incident and thus has a real feel to it. It brings out the head versus heart dilemma that the youth in 'love' faces. However you may find it hard to digest a few sentimental dialogues and decisions. The second half drags a bit as well. Chandrashekar's camera work stands out in the climax. Krishnan Love Story is worth a one time watch". B S Srivani from Deccan Herald wrote "Geetha’s character is the strongest; the director renders it weak in the climax. Ajay Rao is a perfect foil to Radhika. The climax is a clever mixing of the topography of the Hogenakal and the Shivanasamudram. ““Krishna”n Love Story” is the perfect tale for the current monsoon". A critic from Bangalore Mirror wrote  "The music, though pleasant, isn’t great to give the film a push. Radhika Pandit, who plays Geetha, does a brilliant job while Ajai packs in his acting prowess".

Box office
The film opened to a good response and ran successfully across Karnataka. It has completed 150 days.

Awards

References

External links

2010 films
2010s Kannada-language films
Films directed by Shashank
Indian drama films
Films scored by Sridhar V. Sambhram
Kannada films remade in other languages
2010 drama films